The Courier News is a daily newspaper headquartered in Somerville, New Jersey, that serves Somerset County and other areas of Central Jersey. The paper has been owned by Gannett since 1927.

Notable employees
John Curley,  former president, chairman and CEO of Gannett Co., Inc, the first editor of USA Today, chairman of the Newspaper Association of America, and a member of the Gannett Board of Directors from 1983 to 2001. His newspaper career spanned 30 years with Gannett and including publisher of the Courier-News.  The sports journalism department at Penn State is named in his honor.
Tom Curley, former president and chief executive officer of the Associated Press. Curley is also a former president, publisher, and one of the co-creators of USA Today. He was publisher of the Courier-News from 1983 until 1985.
Guy Sterling, retired journalist and currently author of several books and historian in Newark, New Jersey.
Chauncey F. Stout (d. 1972) joined the paper in 1905 as circulation manager, and later served as publisher from 1927 until his retirement in 1957.(11 August 1972). Chauncey F. Stout, A Jersey Publisher, The New York Times, p. 32

References

External links
Courier-News
Official iPhone app
Official Android app
Official mobile version
Official tablet version

Companies based in Somerset County, New Jersey
Newspapers published in New Jersey
Somerville, New Jersey
Gannett publications
Newspapers established in 1884
1884 establishments in New Jersey